Gabi DiCarlo (born July 10, 1985) is a former American stock car racing driver. DiCarlo competed in the X-1R Pro Cup Series, the ARCA Racing Series, and the NASCAR Camping World Truck Series. DiCarlo competed in 51 career ARCA races between 2007 and 2009, and achieved a career best 9th place finish at Kansas Speedway in 2008. She competed in three races during the 2009 NASCAR Camping World Truck Series season. DiCarlo made her series debut at the 2009 San Bernardino County 200 at Auto Club Speedway. Her best NASCAR Truck Series finish was an 18th at Kansas Speedway.

Motorsports career results

NASCAR
(key) (Bold – Pole position awarded by qualifying time. Italics – Pole position earned by points standings or practice time. * – Most laps led.)

Camping World Truck Series

ARCA Re/Max Series
(key) (Bold – Pole position awarded by qualifying time. Italics – Pole position earned by points standings or practice time. * – Most laps led.)

References

External links
 

Living people
1985 births
NASCAR drivers
Racing drivers from Phoenix, Arizona
ARCA Menards Series drivers
American female racing drivers
CARS Tour drivers
21st-century American women